Rodney Carlos Badger (September 8, 1848 – April 12, 1923) was an inaugural member of the general superintendency of the Young Men's Mutual Improvement Association (YMMIA) of the Church of Jesus Christ of Latter-day Saints (LDS Church).

Badger was born in Salt Lake City a year after his Mormon pioneer parents arrived in the Salt Lake Valley. His father was Rodney Badger, who drowned when young Rodney was five years old. Upon reaching adulthood, Badger was a LDS Church missionary to California and worked as a surveyor and telegraph operator with the Utah Central Railroad.

When Junius F. Wells became the first general superintendent of the YMMIA in 1876, he chose Milton H. Hardy and Badger as his assistants. Badger acted in this capacity until 1880, when Wells was released and replaced by Wilford Woodruff.

Badger practiced plural marriage and was married to three wives.

Badger died in Salt Lake City of sepsis from a streptococcus infection.

Notes

References
Andrew Jenson, Latter-day Saint Biographical Encyclopedia, vol. 4
Leon M. Strong (1939). A History of the Young Men's Mutual Improvement Association, 1873–1938 (Provo, Utah: Brigham Young University)

1848 births
1923 deaths
American Mormon missionaries in the United States
Counselors in the General Presidency of the Young Men (organization)
People from Salt Lake City
Deaths from sepsis
Infectious disease deaths in Utah
Deaths from streptococcus infection
19th-century Mormon missionaries
American leaders of the Church of Jesus Christ of Latter-day Saints
Latter Day Saints from Utah